is a Japanese manga series written and illustrated by Odagiri Hotaru. It was serialized in Kadokawa Shoten's shōjo manga magazine Monthly Asuka between October 2005 and June 2017. A 24-episode anime televisions series adaptation was broadcast on Chiba TV from April to September 2010.

Plot
Yuki Sakurai is a teenager with a mysterious ability. He was abandoned at birth near the Asahi orphanage. Because of that event, Yuki strives for independence. He hates being a burden to anyone near him, but at the same time, he is afraid of being left alone. Moreover, ever since he can remember, he has had a strange empathic ability that when he touches others, he can feel their emotions, and generate a very powerful wave of pure yellow light that instantaneously purifies everything in its path which is why he is known as "God's Light."

Unable to control them, he's often made insensitive blunders in the past. He later meets a mysterious yet beautiful stranger who saves his life, but for some reason he feels like they've met before. While death looms and his ability gets stronger and stronger, a man who claims to be his older brother suddenly appears, which raises the question: "What will Yuki do when he learns the whole truth of his previous life?"

Characters

Main

A freshman in high school. His mother Mizuki had left him at birth in order to protect him and he has been living in Asahi Orphanage. When Yuki touches someone who is in emotional pain, he's able to read that person's emotions and see that person's past. This causes him to suffer greatly, but he has unexpectedly grown into an unyielding individual. With absolutely no recollection of his past life, he feels an odd nostalgia for Zess, and ends up relying on him quite often. After he leaves the orphanage and heads off to the Twilight Mansion, he becomes known as "Giou Yuki". Yuki is the most important member of the Giou Clan. He's even mentioned as the "master" of the other Zweilts. His special technique is Hallowed Wall, which puts up a strong barrier of yellow light around others, protecting them from harm but requires a great deal of focus and life energy to erect. However, he can't use it for long, because it requires a lot of mystical energy. Yuki's strongest ability is to bear the pain, and "sins" of the other members. He also heals the other Zweilts by empathically taking their injuries upon himself, usually to the point that he collapses and won't wake for several days. The Zweilt Guardians feel a great amount of guilt for this. Yuki has been reincarnated many times, however this is the first time he was reborn male. It has been mentioned this may be a sign that the fighting is coming to an end or that she wants to forget the past wars and the time she had with her duras lover Luka.

A man with silver eyes and black hair who's been protecting Yuki from the shadows ever since his birth 15 years ago. Despite being a Duras (a.k.a. demon), he's currently an ally of the Giou Clan and is recognized as a traitor by the other Duras. Although his real age is unknown, his appearance is that of a college student. Normally reserved and indifferent, his facial expressions soften when he's with Yuki. His relationship with Yuki is complicated. He is completely dedicated to Yuki, considering him more important than anything else in the world, yet he won't tell him of their relationship in Yuki's previous life. This is yet to be explained. It was during the last war that he changed sides to the Giou Clan, as he apparently made a binding "contract" with Yuki. Luka is a descendant of the "family of sinners" (Zess) and a topmost demon (opasts). As the only Crosszeria with a red Brand Zess, he is also known as "Bloody Cross". Luka battles with a large black sword that can use powerful magic and has a powerful Salamander dragon (Sodom) as his familiar. He was once the loyal dog for the demon king and used to drink his blood, that's why he is stronger than any Opasts. But he left his position after meeting Yuki. It was during the previous battle that Luka met Yuki and they fell in love. Luka promises he will stay with Yuki as long as Yuki wants him to.
 The manga suggests a bit of a darker history. Luka tells Yuki he was considered a slave because he was born into the "sinner" clan, Crosszeria, and that all the other Duras were intent on punishing the whole family and all its descendants for their ancestor's sin.  The demon king owned Luka, and as a symbol of their contract, put his own blood into Luka's brand. The demon king's blood made the brand on Luka's arm glow red, and it caused Luka a great deal of pain during the process. Years later, Luka is still haunted by the memory and feels physically ill when recalling it. Because it was a blood seal, if Luka should ever betray the demon king, he would die. Luka explains to the male incarnation of Yuki that since he made a new contract, the previous contract with the demon king of duras no longer applied, allowing Luka to live.

Zweilt Guardian

The bearer of Kami no Mimi, God's Ears. A high school boy who appears to Yuki along with his sister at the start of the story. He is one of the Zweilt Guardians and also part of the Giou Clan, making him and his sister Yuki's distant relatives. His powers seem to be the ability to speak with animals, sense people, 'hear' the voices of people's hearts, 'hear' the memories of an object, extraordinary hearing, project his voice/thoughts and the ability to draw a gun from his ring during a battle. The name of his gun is Knell (Funeral Bell). For some reason he always has snacks with him. He seems to be extremely close with his older sister Toko, whom he calls Toko-chan and says he will always protect. He was severely injured by Reiga in Episode Ten, but Yuki managed to heal him with his powerful yellow light combined with his empathic abilities.

Tsukumo's older sister, Yuki's relative and also a Zweilt guardian. Her ring produces a huge sword called Eon (Eternity). She attends the same high school as her brother, where their closeness make all the girls jealous of her. She is very fond of Yuki (whom she calls Yuki-chan), telling him that "He is a person who is too kind for his own good" and asking him to refer to her in a more close way (Tōko-chan) instead of calling her Tōko-san. She is the guardian that most interacts with Luka, and sometimes blushes when she is near him, because in her past life, Tōko had a lover who resembled Luka.

The bearer of Kami no Koe, God's Voice. Hotsuma is one of the Zweilt guardians, and he has an uncertain control over his gift, which usually manifests as fire. He is short tempered and impulsive. He has been friends with Shuusei since childhood. At first he dislikes Yuki, since he thinks that he has the same personality he had in his previous life, but with time it seems that he grows somewhat close to him. He was basically abandoned by his parents who labeled him a monster, and the only time they come see him is whenever they need money. Hotsuma's past was shadowed by his fire abilities, and while protecting a classmate, he ended up attacking a few of his classmates, which isolated him from everyone else. Afterwards, he attempted to kill himself, but Shuusei stopped him, but he is burnt in the process. Hotsuma constantly blames himself for Shuusei's scar and is scared of hurting someone, but Yuki is able to calm him. His ring produces a curvy blade called Masterstroke (Divine Skill).

The bearer of Kami no Me, God's Eyes. Shuusei, also part of the guardians, is Hotsuma's childhood friend. He helps the police in solving crimes with his "sixth sense". Fights using crystal balls that he mainly uses for supporting the others and a pair of short swords, called Kurai Kurou (Crime & Punishment), for offense. He seems to be a quiet and sensitive person. He has a tendency of not eating a lot most of the time, as he doesn't have much of an appetite. He disappears suddenly, after seeing that Hotsuma was on better terms with Yuki, stating that he has 'served his purpose' and recognizes the fact that Yuki was able to shatter Hotsuma's fears of being a monster. Then he is kidnapped by Ashley and put into a deep sleep never to wake again. Although Ashley states that it was more that Shusei, desiring to die, stopped his own heart. However, Hotsuma uses his Kami no Koe to command him to "live", which revives Shuusei.

A professional shogi player prodigy who is very quiet and serious by nature. But, once he decides to do something he'll put full effort into doing it even if it means quitting something he loves (e.g., shogi). He gained a love for shogi after he was taken in by Senshirou's grandfather. He lost his original partner during the previous war and Senshirou is now his second partner. He fights with a black katana called Izanagi (Hell).

A zweilt-in-training and a klutz by nature. He decided to become a zweilt after his grandfather was killed by the Opast, Cadenza, while protecting him and Kuroto. Protecting Kuroto and defending the world against Duras are also contributing factors to his becoming a zweilt. Despite the fact that he is not Kuroto's original partner, their relationship has strengthened to an unbreakable bond over time. He even earned Oboro's, Kuroto's fallen partner's, zweilt ring from Kuroto. He has a love for calligraphy and is a college student studying art. He uses a large calligraphy brush to draw spells and a gigantic scythe called Death Scythe.

Giou Clan

Takashiro is first introduced as Yuki's older half-brother. When he meets Yuki for the first time, he tells him that he and his father had been looking for him ever since his birth fifteen years earlier. He is also the head of the Giou clan. As revealed later in the series, Takashiro performed a forbidden ritual that allowed him to take a Duras into his body. Because of this he, unlike the Zweilt Guardians, has not been reincarnated. Instead he has lived for over a thousand years, remembering everything, including how the war with Reiga first began. He also heals almost immediately after being injured. He believes that in order to win the war, there have to be sacrifices. He possesses a grimoire (the Book of Solomon) much like Kanata, although his is red. It has been told that Reiga was his friend.  He is also the one responsible for continually causing Yuki and the Zweilts to reincarnate so they can continue fighting Reiga.  He apologizes for lying to Yuki, telling him that he is not really Yuki's brother, but Yuki forgives him, telling him that despite that, Takashiro is still very important to him. In the manga, which the anime did not adapt from, he eventually becomes overcome by the powerful duras within him who is revealed to be none other a fraction of King Lucifer himself.

The curator at Twilight Mansion and a member of the Giou clan. Tachibana has an upbeat personality and likes to keep conversation going.  It is also mentioned in the manga that he may be a opast.

Isuzu is the Giou's family doctor who works full time at the infirmary located at Twilight Mansion. Isuzu is known for passing out for various days from lack of sleep, which is caused by his sleepless and restless nights of researching the subject of Duras. His words and actions about treatment come out as perverted whether or not he is aware of it. He is fascinated by Duras and always wants to examine Luka.

Others

A childhood friend of Yuki, who grew up with him in the orphanage. Yuki considers him to be an older brother and wanted to emulate his independence. Kanata carries the "Book of Raziel." Kanata frequently asked Yuki to come live with him and appears to be against Yuki's residence in the Twilight Mansion. He mysteriously appears in Ashley's amusement park and him, which Yuki declines. Afterwards, Kanata's eyes seem to turn silver, and his appearance looks very similar to Giou Reiga's. He is actually Reiga's human reincarnation. Due to an as yet unspecified incident involving fire, he has come to hate humans and desires their destruction, although he's conflicted on whether or not to kill Yuki. He even asks himself if he will be "consumed by his memories or his hate?." In the manga, it is explained that the power of the soul of the half-Duras Reiga was too strong for his fully human incarnations before they reached maturity, which is why his power and memories as Reiga are sealed away until his physical body could withstand the strain of all his power.

A supremely powerful zewlit who had fallen deeply in love with the beautiful duras Luka and it was said that that is why Luka betrayed the King of Demons for her. In the manga, Hotsuma said she was stubborn and proud, which is why he didn't like her. She was reborn as a boy and it was "her dying wish". Some of the members believe it's a sign that the fighting is coming to an end. According to Luka, she wishes to forget the troubles of the past, even the days she had spent with him as lovers. Her voice is heard a few times by her male counterpart, but she herself does not appear before him for some reason. Her true intentions remain unknown to this day. 

Takashiro's talented secretary. Ibuki is also the sister of Tsubaki and Yuki's aunt on his mother's side.

She is Ibuki's younger sister and one of Yuki's aunts on his mother's side. She was originally betrothed to Senshirou because of a family agreement. They agreed to break it when Senshirou got closer to Kuroto as an adult. She hates most men, with the exception of Yuki and Senshirou.

The butler of the main residence of the Giou clan. Although he serves the entire residence and its guests, his greatest loyalty resides with Takashiro. He is the most aware of the suffering Takashiro continues to endure as the leader of the Giou clan. His admiration is palpable throughout the story, but he has openly admitted that Takashiro is the one he loves.

Although not much is yet revealed about Aya, Aya takes care of those in the Twilight Mansion. She is also the younger sister of Fuyutoki.

Katsumi is a full time cook at "Twilight Mansion" and a world-class chef. He cares a lot about the diets of the residents of the mansion. He has chastised Isuzu for not eating well. He created tomato bread for Hotsuma

He is a member of the Giou clan and is a necromancer in training.
Oboro
He was the past partner of Kuroto who was brutally killed by Cadenza. His silver is worn by Kuroto as a memento of how much he had meant to him. His abilities were unknown. 

Luka's pet dragon who often serves as one of the series comic reliefs. He has a more larger and realistic appearance of a dragon when fighting, but is often shown in his chibi form which has an split resemblance to Pikachu from the Pokémon franchise. He can also transform into a large wolf; while in his human form, he has dark tan skin, possesses his dragon tail and wolf ears, and has the appearance of a young preteen.

Opasts

She is an Opast who was responsible for the "Sleeping Beauty" syndrome and the abduction of male students. She likes good-looking teenage guys and has a legion of low-class duras that look like dolls at her command.

She is a General class Opast who claims to be in love with Zess (Luka). In the manga, Luka says Elegy is actually male, though Elegy says (s)he possesses both genders.

He is a General class Opast who killed Kuroto's previous partner, but left Kuroto alive. After Kuroto was reincarnated and put into the custody of Senshirou's grandfather for Zweilt training, Cadenza returned to kill Kuroto. The old man died protecting Senshirou and Kuroto, who both now want Cadenza dead. He is also known as the "Master Killer" due to his reputation of turning on the person who summons him.

He is Luka's younger fraternal twin brother. Unlike Luka, he has amethyst-colored eyes, and his hair is longer in length and is worn in a ponytail. In the manga, he seems to relate with Reiga Giou/Kanata in the fact that he is also half Duras, and he harbors feelings of resentment towards Luka because he betrayed the Duras and further soiled the Crosszeria Clan when he had his romance with female Yuki.

Identical twin brothers that fought as a team like the Zweilts. After Jekyll was killed, Elegy allowed Hyde to drink her blood, which gave him a power boost, enabling him to create a copy of himself and fight as though Jekyll were still with him. In the manga, both Jekyll and Hyde were killed in the same battle.

Media

Manga
Uragiri wa Boku no Namae o Shitteiru began running in the shōjo manga magazine Monthly Asuka in October 2005. The first volume was published by Kadokawa Shoten in July 2006. As of May 2017, thirteen volumes have been released completing the series. German publisher Carlsen Comics has licensed the series as Fesseln des Verrats (which means "Shackles of Betrayal"). The translator is Dorothea Überall. As of November 2012, nine volumes have been released. At the 2010 San Diego Comic-Con, manga publisher Yen Press announced they had acquired the license for publication beginning in 2011, under the title The Betrayal Knows My Name. The Yen edition is a two-in-one omnibus edition, translated by Melissa Tanaka.

Drama CD
A drama CD was released in November 2007 by Kadokawa Shoten and a second CD followed shortly after. In May 2010, a third drama CD was released.

Anime
In July 2009, announcement was made that an anime adaption would be directed by Katsushi Sakurabi, written by Natsuko Takahashi, and produced by J.C.Staff. It was officially announced in Monthly Asuka 2009 October issue. The anime officially started airing on April 11, 2010 with 24 planned episodes. The first DVD was released on June 1, 2010, and the second DVD was released on October 1, 2010. The opening theme for the first arc is "Uragiri no nai Sekai made" and the ending theme is "Aoi Ito", both sung by Japanese band Rayflower. The single for both the opening and ending themes was released May 26, 2010. The opening and ending for the second arc are "Inishie" and "Kizuna", sung by the same Japanese band Rayflower who also provided the themes for the first arc. The opening and ending for the second arc was released on August 4, 2010.

Live-action
The August 2011 issue of Kadokawa Shoten's Asuka magazine announced that the manga would be adapted into a live-action stage production which will run in the Ginza district of Tokyo from December 21 to December 25. The cast included Genki Okawa as Yuki Giou (Sakurai), Ire Shiozaki as Zess (Luka Crosszeria), Masakazu Nemoto as Kanata Wakamiya/Reiga Giou, Yu Kariwa as Tsukumo Murasame, Sayaka Chinen as Toko Murasame, Bishin Kawasumi as Hotsuma Renjou, Yamamoto Ikkei as Shūsei Usui, Takafumi Miki as Takashiro Giou, and Tetsuya as Isuzu Fujiwara. The script of the play, staged in November 2012, was published by Kadokawa Shoten in a volume that includes an original UraBoku manga story.

Reception

The fourth, fifth, and sixth volumes of the manga are best sellers according to The New York Times''.

References

External links
  
 

2005 manga
2010s Japanese LGBT-related television series
Anime series based on manga
Dark fantasy anime and manga
Funimation
J.C.Staff
Kadokawa Beans Bunko
Kadokawa Dwango franchises
Kadokawa Shoten manga
Japanese LGBT-related animated television series
Manga adapted into television series
School life in anime and manga
Shōjo manga
Supernatural anime and manga
Yaoi anime and manga
Yen Press titles